Song'e Napule is a 2013 Italian crime-comedy film written and directed by Manetti Bros. and starring Alessandro Roja and Giampaolo Morelli. It premiered at the 2013 Rome Film Festival.

For their performances, Carlo Buccirosso and Paolo Sassanelli won the Nastro d'Argento for best supporting actors. The film also won both Nastro d'Argento and David di Donatello Awards for best score (by Pivio and Aldo De Scalzi) and for best original song (for two different songs, respectively "'A verità" by Alessandro Nelson Garofalo, Rosario Castagnola, Francesco Liccardo and Sarah Tartuffo and "Song'e Napule" by  C. Di Risio, F. D’Ancona and Giampaolo Morelli), as well as the Nastro d'Argento for best comedy film.

Cast  
 
  Alessandro Roja as  Paco Stillo/Pino Dinamite
 Giampaolo Morelli as Lollo Love
 Serena Rossi as  Marianna
 Paolo Sassanelli as  Police Commissioner Cammarota
  Peppe Servillo as  Ciro Serracane
  Ciro Petrone as  Pastetta
  Ivan Granatino as  Nello
 Carlo Buccirosso as  Quaestor Vitali
  Franco Ricciardi as  Boss Scornaienco
  Marco Mario de Notaris as  Attilio

See also    
 List of Italian films of 2013

References

External links

2013 films
2010s crime comedy films
Italian crime comedy films
Films set in Naples
2010s Italian-language films
Films directed by the Manetti Bros.
2010s Italian films